Fomes meliae is a plant pathogen that causes wood rot on nectarine, peach and Platanus sp. (Sycamore).

See also
List of Platanus diseases
List of peach and nectarine diseases

References

Fungi described in 1897
Fungal tree pathogens and diseases
Stone fruit tree diseases
Polyporaceae
Taxa named by Lucien Marcus Underwood